John Cherry III may refer to:

John Cherry III (politician), American politician
John R. Cherry III (1948–2022), American film director